Mithrax spinosissimus, also known as the West Indian spider crab, channel clinging crab, reef or spiny spider crab, or coral crab, is a species of spider crab that occurs throughout South Florida and across the Caribbean Islands. The diet of this crab is largely unknown; however, it is considered a large omnivore, reaching size up to 2 kg, which has been noted to feed on algae and carrion. Unlike crabs such as the blue crab, the West Indian spider crab is not commercially harvested for its meat, though it is said to be delicious.

M. spinosissimus has a reddish-brown carapace and walking legs. The claws are smooth, purplish gray, with a single row of nodules along outer edge and blunt claw tips. The legs are covered with numerous short spines and nodules. It is the largest species of Caribbean reef crab.

M. spinosissumus is common throughout the Caribbean, Florida and Bahamas; it can reach a length of up to 7 inches and has been found as deep as 130 feet. Often found in caves or beneath reef overhangs.

It was made the type species of a separate genus Maguimithrax by Klompmaker et al. (2015).

References

External links
 

Majoidea
Crustaceans described in 1818
Crustaceans of the Atlantic Ocean
Arthropods of the Dominican Republic